Sambasha is a village and an administrative ward in the Arusha District Council located in the Arusha Region of Tanzania. According to the 2012 census, the ward has a total population of 9,484.

References

Wards of Arusha District
Wards of Arusha Region